Typhoon Clara, known in the Philippines as Typhoon Rubing, left flooding in the northern Philippines and southern China during September 1981. An area of disturbed weather was first detected on September 11 near Ponape. After moving westward, the system gradually became better organized and thunderstorm activity increased. On September 16, the system attained tropical storm status. Two days later, Clara attained typhoon intensity and subsequently began to deepen at a faster rate. On September 19, Clara reached maximum intensity, before making landfall along the northern tip of Luzon. Clara steadily weakened after interacting with land, but by late on September 20, Clara leveled off in intensity over the South China Sea. The next day, Clara moved ashore to the east-northeast of Hong Kong while still at typhoon intensity before rapidly dissipating over land.

In the Philippines, 55 people perished. A total of 7,125 homes were damaged and 1,195 houses were destroyed, which left nearly 4,000 people homeless in one province alone. Damage was estimated at $13.4 million (1981 USD), mostly from crops. Offshore, two ships were wrecked, leading to 79 fatalities, although 48 others were rescued. Across China, almost  of farmland were flooded or destroyed, several thousand individuals lost their homes, and 62 people were killed.

Meteorological history 

An area of disturbed weather was first detected by satellite imagery on the afternoon of September 11 near Ponape embedded in the monsoon trough. The disturbance tracked westward, with its development aided by a tropical upper tropospheric trough that provided divergence aloft. Despite some wind shear, thunderstorm activity increased in organization and coverage by the afternoon on September 13. At 18:00 UTC, the Japan Meteorological Agency (JMA) started monitoring the cyclone, classifying it as a tropical depression. Less than two hours later, a Tropical Cyclone Formation Alert (TCFA) was issued by the Joint Typhoon Warning Center (JTWC). Thunderstorm activity continued to increase as the shear relaxed, and at 19:23 UTC on September 14, the TCFA was re-issued. Eighteen hours later, the JTWC classified the system as a tropical storm. At 18:00 UTC on September 16, the JMA did the same.

Upon becoming a tropical storm, the JTWC initially expected Clara to track into Luzon. At 18:00 UTC on September 17, the JMA declared Clara a severe tropical storm. The same day, the Philippine Atmospheric, Geophysical and Astronomical Services Administration (PAGASA) also started monitoring the storm and assigned it with the local name Rubing. By September 18, the JTWC had modified its forecast and called for the storm to re-curve out to sea in response to a weakness in a ridge to its north, but this weakness was only enough to enable a west-northwest track. After satellite images indicated that Clara developed an eye, both the JTWC and JMA reported that Clara had intensified into a typhoon, and subsequently began to rapidly intensify.

After entering the South China Sea, the typhoon began to move northwest, but a ridge to its north prevented re-curvature. The storm weakened some due to land interaction, but leveled off in intensity late on September 20. Clara rapidly dissipated over the hilly terrain of China, but the JMA did not cease tracking its remnants until October 2, after the storm turned to the north and reached 56°N.

Impact 
In the city of Baguio, several small landslides occurred. Throughout the Cagayan province, 3,725 people were rendered homeless and property damage totaled $1.8 million. Nationwide, 55 people died. Nearly 48,000 people sought shelter. A total of 7,125 homes were damaged and 1,195 houses were destroyed. Damage was estimated at $13.4 million, with $10.9 million from crops, $2 million from public infrastructure, and roughly $500,000 from private infrastructure.

Offshore Calayan Island, the  vessel Datu Kalantiaw was wrecked by a coral reef, with 19 of the 97 people necessitating rescue. A total of 52 bodies from the shipwreck were recovered and the remaining others were presumed dead. Additionally, the  ship Sweet Trip sank offshore Zamboanga del Norte Province; 29 of the 30 people aboard were rescued and the remaining person was presumed dead. Twelve victims sustained injures. To search for the missing, authorities dispatched four helicopters, one C-130 transport plane, and an ammunition ship. The United States Navy also provided some assistance initially, but gave up searching on September 23.

Across China, 62 people were killed. Many highways were impassable and there was widespread loss of communication. Several thousand people were homeless due to the flooding. In Hong Kong, a No 1. hurricane signal was issued on September 20. The next day, the signal was increased to a No 3. hurricane signal. All signals were dropped after the typhoon moved inland. Tate's Cairn observed  of rain over a 24-hour period, the highest in the region. Local ferry service and air traffic were disrupted by the typhoon and a few signs were knocked down, but there were no serious reports of damage in the vicinity of Hong Kong.

See also 

Other tropical cyclones named Clara
Typhoon Lynn (1987)

Notes

References 

1981 Pacific typhoon season
1981 disasters in the Philippines
1981 in China
1981 in Hong Kong
Typhoons in the Philippines
Typhoons in China
Typhoons in Hong Kong
Clara